Heart to Heart (foaled  February 2, 2011) is a Canadian Thoroughbred racehorse and the winner of the 2018 Gulfstream Park Turf Handicap.

Career
Heart to Heart's first race was on July 13, 2013, at Arlington, where he came in first. His next win did not come until April 9, 2014, when he won at Keeneland.

Heart to Heart went on a three race winstreak starting on August 20, 2014, when he won the Better Talk Now Stakes. He then won the Jefferson Cup Stakes on September 27, 2014. On November 15, 2014, he then won the Commonwealth Turf Stakes.

Heart to Heart picked up two stakes win during his 2015 season, when he won the August 2nd, 2015 Oceanport Stakes then the November 26th, 2015 River City Handicap.

In 2016, Heart to Heart started off with two wins. First, he won the January 9th, 2016 Fort Lauderdale Stakes. Then, in the following month he captured the February 27th, 2016 Canadian Turf Handicap. He finished off the season with an October 10 win at the Knickerbocker Handicap and a December 17, 2016 win at the El Prado Stakes.

He defended his Canadian Turf Handicap championship successfully, by winning the 2017 version of the race on March 4. He then won the September 4th, 2017 Bernard Baruch Handicap, which was his final win of 2017.

Heart to Heasrt captured the 2018 Gulfstream Park Turf Handicap on February 10, which was his first Grade-1 win. He then picked up another Grade-1 win in his next race when he won the Maker's Mark Mile Stakes on April 13, 2018. He finished in 2nd place at the Shoemaker Mile Stakes on May 28, 2018.

His 2019 season was mostly unsuccessful, as he only raced in 3 races and his best finish was a 3rd place finish at the January 12th, 2019 Tropical Turf Handicap.

Heart to Heart was then retired in 2019. In 2021 he was inducted into the Canadian Horse Racing Hall of Fame.

Pedigree

References

2011 racehorse births
Racehorses bred in Ontario
Racehorses trained in the United States
Canadian Horse Racing Hall of Fame inductees
Thoroughbred family 16-f